Value added selling is one of several sales techniques that relies on building on the inherent value of a product or service.  By its nature the value add technique is a more flexible and customized selling approach that requires input from a defined range of average customers. This customer feedback helps sales and marketing professionals to outline value propositions that are likely to benefit the largest number of customers.

The value add may not be initially apparent in the sales overview and is often tied to upselling or vertical selling within a specific market segment. The utility of the product or service, ease of integration into the customers' business operations or time saving benefits are just a few areas that may be capitalized on when focusing on value add.

Examples 
 Food sold in a plastic box or a glass that can be used after its content is consumed.
 Camera sold with converter to old type of photographic lens.
 One of the more recent examples of value-added selling is hybrid cars.  These are cars that rely on a mix of gasoline power and electric power. The inherent value of the product is still the same. It moves a person from point A to point B.  The value add can be seen in several different ways.  The first is the obvious fuel savings. But there is also added value in less time spent at the gas station, and the cars pollute the air less than a normal combustion engine.  The value add in this instance is determined by the customer, and not the company selling the car.

References 

Selling techniques